Scopula innocens is a moth of the  family Geometridae. It is found in Australia (Queensland).

References

Moths described in 1886
innocens
Moths of Australia